Orophia is a moth genus of the superfamily Gelechioidea.

Taxonomy
The systematic placement is problematic. It was often placed in tribe Orophiini of subfamily Oecophorinae, sometimes it was placed in the tribe Cryptolechiini and/or assigned to subfamily Depressariinae, which was alternatively treated as a subfamily of the Elachistidae, but today an independent family of Gelechioidea.

Species
Species are:
Orophia ammopleura (Meyrick, 1920)
Orophia denisella (Denis & Schiffermuller, 1775)
Orophia eariasella (Walker, 1864)
Orophia ferrugella (Denis & Schiffermuller, 1775)
Orophia hadromacha (Meyrick, 1937)
Orophia haemorrhanta (Meyrick, 1924)
Orophia haeresiella (Wallengren, 1875)
Orophia imbutella (Christoph, 1888)
Orophia languidula (Meyrick, 1921)
Orophia madagascariensis (Viette, 1951)
Orophia melicoma (Meyrick, 1931)
Orophia mendosella (Zeller, 1868)
Orophia ochroxyla (Meyrick, 1937)
Orophia pachystoma (Meyrick, 1921)
Orophia quadripunctella (Viette, 1955)
Orophia roseoflavida (Walsingham, 1881)
Orophia sordidella (Hübner, 1796)
Orophia taurina (Meyrick, 1928)
Orophia tetrasticta (Meyrick, 1917)
Orophia thesmophila (Meyrick, 1930)
Orophia toulgoetianum (Viette, 1954)
Orophia tranquilla (Meyrick, 1927)
Orophia transfuga (Meyrick, 1911)
Orophia xanthosarca (Meyrick, 1917)
Orophia zernyi (Szent-Ivany, 1942)

References

 
Cryptolechiinae